The 2002 Queen's Birthday and Golden Jubilee Honours in New Zealand, celebrating the official birthday of Queen Elizabeth II and the golden jubilee of her reign, were appointments made by the Queen in her right as Queen of New Zealand, on the advice of the New Zealand government, to various orders and honours to reward and highlight good works by New Zealanders. They were announced on 3 June 2002.

The recipients of honours are displayed here as they were styled before their new honour.

Order of New Zealand (ONZ)
Additional Member
 Dame (Reubina) Ann Ballin  – of Christchurch.
 The Right Honourable Sir Robin Brunskill Cooke, The Lord Cooke of Thorndon  – of Wellington.
 Professor Sir (Ian) Hugh Kāwharu – of Auckland.
 Dame Catherine Anne Tizard    – of Auckland.

New Zealand Order of Merit

Principal Companion (PCNZM)
 Sir Patrick Ledger Goodman  – of Motueka. For services to business, the arts and the community.
 The Right Honourable Sir Ivor Lloyd Morgan Richardson – of Wellington. For services as president of the Court of Appeal of New Zealand.

Distinguished Companion (DCNZM)
 Leslie Hutchins  – of Queenstown. For services to conservation and tourism.
 Professor Vaughan Frederick Randal Jones – of California, United States. For services to mathematics.
 Dr David Charles Mauger – of Auckland. For services to paediatrics.
 Dorothy Huhana Mihinui   – of Rotorua. For services to Māori, tourism and the community.
 Dr Margaret June Sparrow  – of Wellington. For services to medicine and the community.
 Sukhinder Kaur Turner – of Dunedin. For services to local government.

Companion (CNZM)
 Rosalind Alice Burdon – of Christchurch. For services to the arts and the community.
 Dr Henry Eamonn Connor – of Christchurch. For services to botany.
 John Allan Gallagher  – of Hamilton. For services to local-body and community affairs.
 Judge Carolyn Henwood – of Wellington. For services as a District and Youth Court judge, and to the arts.
 Dr Diana Florence Hill – of Dunedin. For services to science.
 The Honourable Robert Andrew McGechan  – of Paraparaumu. For services as a judge of the High Court.
 David Graham McGee  – of Wellington. For services to Parliament.
 Professor Joel Ivor (Jim) Mann – of Dunedin. For services to medicine.
 Leslie Roy Mills  – of Auckland. For services to local government and sport.
 Merwyn Norrish – of Wellington. For public services.
 Charmaine Grace Pountney – of Waiuku. For services to education.
 Judge Heather McGregor Simpson – of Thames. For services as a District Court judge.
 Neil Douglas Walter – of Wellington. For services as Secretary of Foreign Affairs and Trade.
 Dr (Barbara) Gay Williams  – of Auckland. For services to nursing.
 The Right Reverend Bishop Godfrey Edward Armstrong Wilson – of Auckland. For services to the community.

Officer (ONZM)
 Judith Mary Ablett-Kerr  – of Dunedin. For services to the legal profession.
 Murray Hone Ball – of Gisborne. For services as a cartoonist.
 Dr Helen Maud Bichan – of Wellington. For services to medicine.
 Michael Jonathan Chunn – of Auckland. For services to music.
 Professor Michael Charles Corballis – of Auckland. For services to psychological science.
 Dr Jean Sutherland Fleming – of Dunedin. For services to science.
 Ruth Gilbert (Florence Ruth Mackay) – of Motueka. For services to poetry.
 Rear Admiral Raymond John Gillbanks – Royal New Zealand Navy (Retired).
 Diane Elizabeth Grant – of Masterton. For services to the community.
 The Honourable Peter John Gresham  – of Waverley. For public services.
 Miranda Catherine Millais Harcourt – of Wellington. For services to theatre and the community.
 Professor Jane Elizabeth Harding – of Auckland. For services to paediatrics.
 Mark Joseph Inglis – of Renwick. For services to persons with disabilities.
 Richard John Killeen – of Auckland. For services to painting.
 James Grant Kirby – of Warkworth. For services to local government.
 Elizabeth Fiona Knox – of Wellington. For services to literature.
 Sheila Kathleen Laxon – of Cambridge. For services to racing.
 Dennis Michael McGrath – of North Shore City. For services to education.
 Harvey John McQueen  – of Wellington. For services to education and literature.
 Ashley David Mazey – of Taupō. For services to skiing and tourism.
 Professor Robyn Eileen Munford – of Palmerston North. For services to social work education and policy.
 David Stanley Norris – of North Shore City. For services to athletics and the community.
 Professor Erik Newland Olssen – of Dunedin. For services to historical research.
 John Shotton Parker – of Blenheim. For services to painting.
 Professor John Greville Agard Pocock – of Baltimore, Maryland, United States. For services to the history of political thought.
 Professor Anthony Edmund Reeve – of Dunedin. For services to medical science.
 Barbara Joan Rocco – of Picton. For services to persons with disabilities.
 Richard George Scott – of Auckland. For services to historical research.
 Sylvia Grace Siddell – of Auckland. For services to painting.
 Greer Lascelles Twiss – of Auckland. For services to sculpture.
 Christiaan Willem Schmeil Van Kraayenoord – of Palmerston North. For services to agriculture and forestry.
 Peter James Vela – of Hamilton. For services to horse racing and the bloodstock industry.
 Peter Vere-Jones – of Paekākāriki. For services to acting and writing.
 Yvonne Mignon Willering – of Waitakere (West Auckland). For services to netball.

Additional
 Lieutenant Colonel Peter William Wood – Royal New Zealand Infantry Regiment.
 Acting Lieutenant Colonel James William Blackwell – Royal New Zealand Infantry Regiment.

Honorary
 Ambassador Paul Matthews Cleveland – of Virginia, United States. For services to United States of America–New Zealand relations.
 Dr Young-in Park – of Seoul, Republic of Korea. For services to Korea–New Zealand relations.
 Stanley Tan – of Singapore. For services to Singapore–New Zealand relations.

Member (MNZM)
 Wing Commander John Richard Baddock – Royal New Zealand Air Force (Retired).
 Robyn Clare Bigelow – of Waitakere City. For services to the community.
 David Lory Blanchard – of Christchurch. For services to rugby league and the community.
 Paul Francis Brennan – of Paraparaumu Beach; inspector, New Zealand Police.
 Bub Bridger – of Granity. For services to literature.
 The Reverend John Dermot Buchanan – of Taupō. For services to the community.
 Stuart Duncan Buchanan – of Christchurch. For services to jazz and music education.
 John Campbell  – of North Hokianga. For services to the community.
 Hilda Joyce Corrin – of Levin. For services to theatre.
 James Ronald Dart – of Auckland. For services to town planning.
 Ronald Charles Dick – of Dunedin. For services to the deaf.
 Elinor Elder – of Tauranga, For services to local body and community affairs.
 Dr Graham Charles Everitt – of Tauranga. For services to agricultural science.
 The Reverend Maurice Manawaroa Gray  – of Christchurch. For services to Māori.
 Elizabeth Alisa Grant Grimmer – of Waitakere City. For services to sport and the community.
 Peter Sedgley Hanan – of Morrinsville. For services to the community.
 Christopher Hawley – of Auckland. For services to international relations.
 Master Air Electronics Operator Peter Allan Hilliard – Royal New Zealand Air Force.
 Avelda Juanita Howie – of Clyde. For services to the community.
 Dr Rexley Blake Hunton – of Kerikeri. For services to public health.
 Graham James Iversen – of Auckland. For services to special needs children.
 Rhyl, Lady Jansen  – of Orewa. For services to the community.
 Joseph Frederick Campbell Johnson – of Upper Hutt. For services to amateur radio.
 Warrant Officer Peter Wayne Johnson – Royal New Zealand Navy.
 Jennifer Norah Kirk – of North Shore City. For services to local-body and community affairs.
 Christine Beverley Knock – of Manukau City. For services to the community.
 Denise Ann L'Estrange-Corbet – of Auckland. For services to fashion design.
 Wesley Owen Lisle – of Papakura. For services to rugby league.
 William Stuart McIntosh  – of Alexandra. For services to local-body and community affairs.
 Arthur Barry Magee – of Auckland. For services to sport.
 Wayne Ashley Mason – of Paekākāriki. For services to music.
 John Douglas Matheson – of Masterton. For services to business and the community.
 Thomas Joseph Mechen – of Palmerston North. For services to horticulture.
 (Victor) Ross Moore – of Porirua. For services to science administration.
 Lieutenant Commander David Lewis Mundy – Royal New Zealand Navy.
 Mavis Raylene Mullins – of Dannevirke. For services to the wool industry.
 Mereana Peka – of Ōtara. For services to the community.
 Anne Elizabeth Riddell – of Wellington. For services to children's health.
 Maxwell Greig Scott – of Dunedin. For services to sports journalism.
 Theresa Ruth (Terry) Scott  – of Hamilton. For services to the community.
 Robert Graham Sinclair – of Christchurch. For services to business and the community.
 Donald Alexander Sloss – of Cheviot. For services to persons with disabilities and the community.
 Peter Stichbury – of Manurewa. For services to pottery.
 Paul Szentirmay – of Wellington. For services to librarianship and the Hungarian community.
 Miriama Kaiaha Tahi – of Te Kūiti. For services to the Māori community.
 Lawrence Edward Tall – of Invercargill. For services to cycling.
 Maaka Tauranga Tibble – of Gisborne. For services to persons with disabilities.
 Thomas Graeme Todd – of Nelson. For services to the community.
 Winifred Eleanor Todd – of Waimate. For services to the community.
 Henry Joseph Uttinger  – of Mount Maunganui. For services to the community.
 Jean Agnes Vickridge  – of Hamilton. For services to the community.
 Sandra Waddell – of Wellington. For services to persons with disabilities.

Additional
 Lieutenant Thomas John O'Reilly – New Zealand Intelligence Corps.
 Flying Officer Jade Ann Streeter – Royal New Zealand Air Force.
 Flight Sergeant Martyn Leigh Stacey – Royal New Zealand Air Force.
 Sergeant Trevor McLachlan – New Zealand Intelligence Corps.
 Corporal Damon Matthew O'Donnell – Royal New Zealand Army Medical Corps.
 Private Kane Kenneth McCollum – Royal New Zealand Army Medical Corps.

Companion of the Queen's Service Order (QSO)

For community service
 Catherine Anne Devereux – of Dunedin.
 Mere Arihi Te Huinga Edwards-Hema – of Gisborne.
 Derek Bowden Hayman – of Timaru.
 Elizabeth Ann (Betsy) Marshall – of Auckland.
 The Reverend Canon (William) David Morrell – of Christchurch.
 Abdul Rahim Rasheed – of Auckland.
 Daniel Puna Tumahai  – of Auckland.

For public services
 Gerald David Gibb Bailey – of Hamilton.
 Mark Herbert Blumsky – of Wellington.
 Denise Frances Church – of Wellington.
 Waana Morrell Davis – of Lower Hutt.
 Robert Charles Francis  – of Masterton.
 The Reverend Dr Bruce Mervyn Hucker – of Auckland.
 Bruce Alexander Grenfell Murray – of Wellington.
 The Honourable Katherine Victoria O'Regan  – of Te Awamutu.
 David Oughton – of Porirua.
 The Honourable Noel Scott – of Mount Maunganui.
 Arthur James (Jim) Sinclair  – of Auckland.

Queen's Service Medal

For community service
 Frederick Keith Adams – of New Plymouth.
 Lois Audrey Burnley – of Wainuiomata.
 Ellen Barbara Cecile Butterworth – of Ōpōtiki.
 Hugh James Cook – of Picton.
 Waltherus Nicolaas Gerardus Antonius de Bont – of Taupō.
 Charles Ding  – of Wellington.
 Helen Hoi Lun Ding – of Wellington.
 Jane Louise Edgar – of Auckland.
 Leslie Arthur Green – of Dunedin.
 Niranjan Singh Grewal  – of Manukau City.
 Edward William Guy – of Waharoa.
 Jeanette Claire Hastie – of Mount Maunganui.
 Frances Joan Howard – of Motueka.
 Sophie Ropina Keefe – of Wellington.
 Audrey Elizabeth Larsen – of Kaikorai, Dunedin.
 The Reverend John Victor Lill   – of Kerikeri.
 John Brian McCarthy – of Hokitika.
 Ellen May Eva McCormack – of Tauranga.
 Emora Magatogia – of Auckland.
 Hana Morrison – of Rotorua.
 Valerie Elsie Murray – of Auckland.
 Douglas Charles Nelmes – of Christchurch.
 Brenda Kay Ormsby – of Rotorua.
 Stanley Arthur Thomas Potter – of Christchurch.
 Mei Ngaronoa Rawiri – of Waimamaku.
 Maxwell Bruce Rolston  – of Rotorua.
 The Reverend Leao Tinitali Si'Itia – of Auckland.
 Garry Raymond Snelgrove – of Wainuiomata.
 Kararaina Te Wera Taite – of Palmerston North.
 Kanti Lakha Vasan  – of Wellington.
 Murray Walter – of Te Awamutu.
 Marama Rosina Whaiapu – of Manukau City.
 David Roland Winstanley – of Blenheim.
 Enid Frances Wordsworth – of Tauranga.
 David Andrew Young – of Dunedin.

For public services
 Kathleen Anne Adams – of Kaiapoi.
 Neil Leonard Adams – of Auckland; inspector, New Zealand Police.
 Letele Amani  – of Auckland.
 Charles Patrick Gordon Baker – of Kawerau.
 Genevieve Frances Becroft – of North Shore City.
 George Frederick Bissett – of Auckland.
 Dr Andrew Hamilton Buchanan – of Christchurch.
 Graeme Bernard Carley – of Auckland.
 Kathryn Joy Cox – of Blackball.
 Clyde Rodney Cunningham – of Napier; senior station officer, Napier Volunteer Unit, New Zealand Fire Service.
 Jack Warwick De Vere  – of Waitakere City.
 Neiel Winston Drain – of Christchurch.
 Tania Marion Eden – of Porirua; inspector, New Zealand Police.
 Barry David Fisher – of Taumarunui; chief fire officer, Taumarunui Volunteer Fire Brigade, New Zealand Fire Service.
 John Gallocher – of Paraparaumu.
 Leslie Ritchie Gibson – of Wellington.
 Ana Gillet  – of Invercargill.
 Bruce Hutton – of Porirua; senior constable, New Zealand Police.
 Riripeti Hera Joyce – of Papakura.
 Lyla Bernice Koppen – of Takapau.
 Colin Stanley McGregor – of Kerikeri.
 William Porteous McKerrow  – of Oamaru.
 Annabel Marie McLaren – of Ōtaki.
 Noeline Matthews – of Lower Hutt.
 Thomas Joseph Muir – of Hamilton.
 Dr Allan David Nichols – of Porirua.
 Tania Pearle Pari – of Rotorua.
 Laurence Arthur Comyn Pigou – of Blenheim.
 Michael Edwin Porter – of Blenheim; sergeant, New Zealand Police.
 Eva Rawnsley – of Paekākāriki.
 Joan Roche – of Invercargill.
 David William Ryan – of Waitakere City; senior sergeant, New Zealand Police.
 Graham Robert Thorp – of Taradale.
 Karl Leonard Tuinukuafe  – of Auckland.
 Clarence Vivian Wills – of Auckland.
 Maurice Te Pouri Wilson – of Manukau City.

References

Birthday Honours
2002 awards
2002 in New Zealand
New Zealand awards